Ri Hi-yong is a North Korean politician.  He is a member of the Politburo of the  Central Committee of the Workers' Party of Korea and Chairman of the Party Committee of North Hamgyong Province.

Biography
After deputy Chairman of the WPK North Hamgyong Provincial Committee, on October 7, 2014, he was elected a member of the Central Committee of the Party and Chairman of the WPK North Hamgyong Provincial Committee.

References

North Korean politicians
Year of birth missing (living people)
Place of birth missing (living people)
Living people
Members of the 8th Central Committee of the Workers' Party of Korea